The Pișcolt oil field is located in Pișcolt, Satu Mare County, Romania. The oilfield was discovered in 2005 and developed by the Romanian oil company Rompetrol. Production began in 2008, the total proven reserves of the Pișcolt oil field are around 20 million barrels (2.7 million tonnes).

References

Oil fields in Romania